The 2014 Budweiser Duels were a pair of NASCAR Sprint Cup Series stock car races that were held on February 20, 2014, at Daytona International Speedway in Daytona Beach, Florida. Both contested over 60 laps, they were the qualifying races for the 2014 Daytona 500. Joe Gibbs Racing swept the Duel races, with Matt Kenseth winning the first race. Kevin Harvick finished second, while Kasey Kahne, Marcos Ambrose and Dale Earnhardt Jr. rounded out the top five. Denny Hamlin won the second race, ahead of Jeff Gordon, while Kurt Busch, Paul Menard and Brian Scott rounded out the top five.

These were the first Budweiser Duel races to be held in primetime, as the races were previously held in the early afternoon. The Duels were telecast on Fox Sports 1.

Report

Background

Daytona International Speedway is one of six superspeedways to hold NASCAR races, the others being Michigan International Speedway, Auto Club Speedway, Indianapolis Motor Speedway, Pocono Raceway and Talladega Superspeedway. The track's turns are banked at 31 degrees, while the front stretch, the location of the finish line, is banked at 18 degrees.

Practice and qualifying
Matt Kenseth, Joey Logano, Paul Menard, Dave Blaney, Ryan Truex, Trevor Bayne and Parker Kligerman were involved in a crash on the frontstretch of Daytona during early practice on February 19, that resulted in heavy damage for Logano, Menard, Blaney, Truex, and Kligerman. This forced the teams to set up backup cars for the Duel races the following evening. Workers had to repair two sections of the catch fencing, ending practice early. Brian Vickers and Cole Whitt were also involved in a crash earlier during this practice, forcing Vickers to a backup car while Whitt's team was forced to repair their primary, as Swan Racing's only backup was given to Kligerman. Blaney eventually withdrew from the race after his team could not secure a backup car. Kligerman stated that it was the first flip of his career, and that he "assumed it would be rougher. It was pretty soft. I was up in the fence floating along. Then it just slid over softly". Logano stated that Kenseth had "started making a move to go down" and that he "was making the run, and I was going to fill that hole. He started to come back up and I was there".

Races

Race 1
Austin Dillon led the field to the green flag at 7:16 p.m., and after leading the first 14 laps, Dillon lost the lead to Dale Earnhardt Jr. on lap 15. Matt Kenseth took the lead on lap 28, and held the lead until lap 37, when he pitted and the lead was passed to Earnhardt Jr. once again. Earnhardt Jr. and Kasey Kahne each held the lead for a lap before Kenseth cycled back to the lead with 21 laps to go. On the last lap, Kevin Harvick pulled up alongside Matt Kenseth, while Kahne got to the inside, creating a three-wide photo finish in which Kenseth prevailed. Michael McDowell and Joe Nemechek failed to make the Daytona 500. Kenseth stated that he "was kind of embarrassed to walk in the garage" but felt that his race performance "builds confidence in all of us, makes us feel like you can go out and get the job done if everybody does their jobs and we do everything right". Harvick's car failed post-race inspection because his car exceeded the maximum split on the track bar. He was disqualified, but his speed in qualifying was enough to get him into the Daytona 500. Greg Zipadelli, the competitions director at Harvick's team – Stewart-Haas Racing – referred to the infraction as "an adjustment during the race and it was more than it should have been".

Race 2
Martin Truex Jr. led the field to the green flag at 8:40 p.m., and Brad Keselowski took the lead on lap 2. Keselowski held the race lead for the next portion of the race, holding it until his pit stop on lap 36, which handed the lead to Casey Mears. On his pit stop, Keselowski was deemed to have been speeding while exiting, and had to serve a pass-through penalty. Denny Hamlin took the lead with 23 laps to go, and maintained the race lead until the end of the race, winning under caution.

Coming through turn four on the final lap, Jimmie Johnson ran out of gas, got loose after being tapped in the left corner panel, overcorrected and hit the wall collecting Jamie McMurray in the process. Truex Jr. had no way to avoid the wreck and rear-ended McMurray. While slowing to avoid the wreck, Clint Bowyer got rear-ended by Ryan Truex, slid to the runoff area taking David Ragan with him. Bowyer flipped over in the air and landed on all four wheels with the only damage being a destroyed drive-train. Ragan and Michael Waltrip were also caught in the wreck and both hit the inside wall head-on. Carl Edwards was caught by McMurray, but sustained minimal damage. McMurray made contact with Johnson again as they continued on into the grass, destroying the front ends of their cars. Bobby Labonte and Terry Labonte, who were both 30 seconds behind the leader on the final lap, raced their way into the Daytona 500, at the expense of Eric McClure, Morgan Shepherd and Ryan Truex. Hamlin's team owner, Joe Gibbs, stated Hamlin had "worked extremely hard" for the result, and he thought his team was "all hungry when the year started".

Results

Duel 1

Qualifying

Race results

Duel 2

Qualifying

Race results

Footnotes

References

Budweiser Duels
Budweiser Duels
Budweiser Duels
NASCAR races at Daytona International Speedway